Han Xue (韓 雪, born 21 September 1981 in Beijing) is a Chinese swimmer and Olympic medalist. She participated at the 1996 Summer Olympics in Atlanta, winning a bronze medal in 4 x 100 metre medley relay. She also competed at the 2000 Summer Olympics in Sydney.

References

External links

1981 births
Living people
Swimmers from Beijing
Olympic swimmers of China
Olympic bronze medalists for China
Swimmers at the 1996 Summer Olympics
Swimmers at the 2000 Summer Olympics
World record setters in swimming
Olympic bronze medalists in swimming
Chinese female freestyle swimmers
Medalists at the FINA World Swimming Championships (25 m)
Universiade medalists in swimming
Asian Games medalists in swimming
Asian Games gold medalists for China
Asian Games silver medalists for China
Swimmers at the 1998 Asian Games
Medalists at the 1998 Asian Games
Universiade gold medalists for China
Medalists at the 1996 Summer Olympics
Medalists at the 2001 Summer Universiade